__notoc__

Graeme Nicholson (30 September 1936 — 21 February 2021) was a Canadian philosopher and Emeritus Professor of philosophy at the University of Toronto known for his research on ontology, hermeneutics, and anarchism.
He completed his doctorate at the University of Toronto with a thesis on Heidegger directed by Emil Fackenheim.

Bibliography
 Justifying Our Existence: An Essay in Applied Phenomenology (New Studies in Phenomenology and Hermeneutics), 2009
 Plato's Phaedrus: The Philosophy of Love (Purdue University Press Series in the History of Philosophy), 1999
 Illustrations of Being: Drawing upon Heidegger and upon Metaphysics (Contemporary Studies in Philosophy and the Human Sciences),  Humanity Books, 1992
 Seeing and Reading (Contemporary Studies in Philosophy and the Human Sciences), Palgrave Macmillan, 1984
 Hans-Georg Gadamer on Education, Poetry and History, 1992
 Heidegger’s Being and Time: Critical Essays (Critical Essays on the Classics Series), 2005

See also
 Philosophy in Canada

References

20th-century Canadian philosophers
21st-century Canadian philosophers
Hermeneutists
Phenomenologists
Continental philosophers
Daseinsanalysis
Existentialists
Philosophy academics
Heidegger scholars
Academic staff of the University of Toronto
University of Toronto alumni
Dalhousie University alumni
Union College (New York) alumni
Living people
1936 births